Henry Leonel Patta Quintero (born January 14, 1987) is an Ecuadorian footballer who plays for Gualaceo.

Career
Patta began his football career playing for the youth side of El Nacional. He played for Sociedad Deportiva Aucas in Ecuador's Serie B during 2007, when he was the club's second leading scorer, notching eight goals. Patta returned to El Nacional and began playing for the senior side in Ecuador's Serie A during 2008 and 2009. He was included in El Nacional's squad list for the 2009 Copa Libertadores.

Personal life
Patta's brother, Elvis Patta, is also a professional footballer.

References

External links
 Profile at BDFA.com.ar 
 
 

1987 births
Living people
Footballers from Quito
Association football forwards
Ecuadorian footballers
Ecuadorian expatriate footballers
Barcelona S.C. footballers
C.D. El Nacional footballers
S.D. Aucas footballers
C.D. Universidad Católica del Ecuador footballers
Cobreloa footballers
Mushuc Runa S.C. footballers
Delfín S.C. footballers
Ecuadorian Serie A players
Primera B de Chile players
Expatriate footballers in Chile
Ecuadorian expatriate sportspeople in Chile